The New Adventures of Ocean Girl is an Australian animated television series inspired by the live-action series Ocean Girl.

Plot synopsis
On the planet of Oceana there were four life giving crystals guarded by the Sacred Whales, the keepers of wisdom. Thousands of years ago Galiel, the evil space wizard, stole one of the crystals and upset the balance of nature. Now Neri, Princess of Oceana, must search for the crystal and restore the balance of nature.

Cast
Sigrid Thornton - Narrator
Marnie Reece-Wilmore - Princess Neri
 Samuel Johnson - Prince Jobah
Michael Carman - Galiel, Laziah, Captain Sharkana
Marg Downey - Elgar, Mandrool, Sheema
Gary Files - Zardor
Dennis Pryor - King Nemon
Doug Tremlett - Neanda, Amphibian Lieutenant, Flyer
Stephen Whittaker - Moza
Abbe Holmes - Griffin, Flyers
Michael Veitch - Flyer
Hamish Hughes - Mole
Lucy Taylor - Mad Flyer
Fred Parslow - Keeper of Time

Episodes
The Return (11 February 2000)
Possessed (18 February 2000)
Hearing The Call (25 February 2000)
A Common Bond (3 March 2000)
The Quest Begins (10 March 2000)
Neri Has The Power (17 March 2000)
The Keeper Of The Crystal (24 March 2000)
The Test Of Faith (31 March 2000)
The Promise Is Kept (7 April 2000)
The Crystal Is Returned (14 April 2000)
The Crystal Or A Friend (21 April 2000)
Secrets Of The Ancient (28 April 2000)
Elgar And Moza For Dinner (5 May 2000)
Fearless (12 May 2000)
The Truth Is Kept Secret (19 May 2000)
Galiel Unites The Clans (26 May 2000)
The Keeper Of Time (2 June 2000)
The Deepest, Darkest Chasm (9 June 2000)
Elgar’s Crystal (16 June 2000)
That Sinking Feeling (23 June 2000)
Moza’s Time Of Reckoning (30 June 2000)
Queen Elgar (7 July 2000)
The Surfacing (14 July 2000)
Neanda Leads The Way (21 July 2000)
The Countdown (28 July 2000)
The Time Has Come (5 August 2000)

References

External links

2000 Australian television series debuts
2000 Australian television series endings
2000s Australian animated television series
Australian children's animated action television series
Australian children's animated adventure television series
Australian children's animated drama television series
Australian children's animated science fantasy television series
Network 10 original programming
Television series by Beyond Television Productions